This article provides details of international football games played by the Poland national football team from 2020 to present.

Results

2020

2021

2022

Head to head records

Notes

References

Football in Poland
Poland national football team
2020s in Polish sport